Itt a szabadság! is a 1991 Hungarian drama film directed by Péter Vajda. It was entered into the 17th Moscow International Film Festival.

Cast
 Péter Andorai as Kopa Imre
 Evdokiya Germanova as Duszja
 Sándor Fábry as Figaró
 Károly Löwy as Karcsi
 Sándor Varga as Sanyika
 Ági Szirtes as Kopáné, Marika (as Szirtes Ágnes)
 András Stohl
 András Schlanger

References

External links
 

1991 films
1991 drama films
Hungarian drama films
1990s Hungarian-language films